Samuel Babcock may refer to:
 Samuel G. Babcock (1851–1942), American bishop in the Episcopal Church
 Samuel D. Babcock (1822–1902), American banker
 Sam Babcock (1901–1970), American football player